= Parallel generation =

Parallel generation refers to the generation of electric power directly by consumers instead of purchasing it from an integrated electric utility company. Generally, it seems that parallel generation of electric power is taken on by institutions, such as hospitals, manufacturers or other large organizations. It may be understood that individuals typically do not have an economic incentive to invest in and organize such specialized services as electric power generation.
